This article lists those who have held the office of the Minister of Agrarian Affairs and Spatial Planning in Indonesia as well as its forerunners.

References 

Lists of political office-holders in Indonesia